Terror on the Prairie is a 2022 American Western film directed by Michael Polish and written by Josiah Nelson. It was produced by The Daily Wire and Bonfire Legend, and distributed by The Daily Wire and Voltage Pictures. The film follows a family of pioneers as they defend themselves from a vicious gang of outlaws hell-bent on revenge on the Montana plains. The film features the cast of Gina Carano as Hattie McAllister, Donald Cerrone as Jeb McAllister, and Nick Searcy starring as The Captain, with Rhys Jackson Becker, Gabriel-Kane Day Lewis, Tyler Fischer, Heath Freeman, Samaire Armstrong, and Matthias Hues all featured in supporting roles.

Terror on the Prairie was released on The Daily Wire on June 14, 2022. It was not widely reviewed but the reviews were generally positive.

Plot
Several years after the end of the Civil War, veteran Jeb McAllister and his wife Hattie struggle to raise their adolescent son Will and infant daughter in the wilds of Montana. Hattie is disillusioned with the drudgery of frontier life and wants to move back to her parents' land in the east, against Jeb's wishes to be self-reliant and capable of raising their family on the own. After Jeb leaves to find work so they can raise money for traveling, four strangers arrive and ask Hattie for some food and water — although, once she sees human scalps tied to their saddles, she kicks them out. 

However, the outlaws do not go far. Instead, a stand-off emerges after repeated attempts to break into the McAllister cabin are foiled by Hattie and Will, with one outlaw getting killed. As night falls, Hattie realizes that the reason the outlaws are unwilling to leave is that they are looking for Jeb (who is still in town) and want to use her and their children as bait. Jeb, meanwhile, after failing to find any work and spending the evening drinking in a saloon.  He notices wanted posters of the men and recognizes then not just from passing them by earlier, but also from his past, rushes back to the cabin. The couple slip out of their burning cabin and attempt to hide in the wilderness.

Will manages to hide with his younger sister, but Hattie is captured by the outlaws. Jeb tries but fails to save her. The outlaw leader, whom the story refers to as the "captain", turns out to be Jeb's former commander; he wants Jeb to pay for accidentally killing his only daughter after betraying him and his family to Union soldiers during the war. Jeb and Hattie are dragged out to face a lynching. However, Hattie tricks the captain into leaving her alone with an outlaw, allowing her to draw a hidden knife and kill him. Hattie then reemerges and, after a shoot-out, she kills the captain and Jeb kills the remaining outlaw. The film ends with the McAllister family rebuilding their cabin with money from the bounty on the deceased outlaws.

Cast
 Gina Carano as Hattie McAllister
 Donald Cerrone as Jeb McAllister 
 Tyler Fischer as Long Hair 
 Gabriel-Kane Day-Lewis as The Kid 
 Rhys Jackson Becker as Will McAllister
 Matthias Hues as Mr. Samuelson
 Samaire Armstrong as Soiled Dove
 Heath Freeman as Gold Teeth
 Nick Searcy as The Captain

Additionally, Travis Mills, Izzy Marshall, Jeremy Gauna, and Thomas White Eagle are among the supporting cast.

Production

Development
On February 12, 2021, Deadline Hollywood reported that Gina Carano was set to develop, produce, and star in an upcoming film, which The Daily Wire would release exclusively to its members. When asked of her new film, Carano replied, "The Daily Wire is helping make one of my dreams — to develop and produce my own film — come true. I cried out and my prayer was answered." The original plan had been to adapt the book "White Knuckle" by Eric Red but that project was pushed back in favor of making Terror On The Prairie instead. The film was produced as part of The Daily Wires partnership with producer Dallas Sonnier and his Bonfire Legend banner. The Daily Wire co-founder Jeremy Boreing said that despite the presumptions of The Daily Wire entering the film business to produce "hyper-politicized movies or milquetoast dramas", the intent was to produce "top-quality entertainment that all Americans can love."  On October 12, 2021, Michael Polish was announced as director, with Josiah Nelson writing the script, while Carano, Sonnier and Amanda Presmyk were producing. Polish was attracted to the story as it focussed on the American frontier, and said: "Returning to my home state of Montana to direct a western for [Sonnier] and [Presmyk], a rare of breed of producers who I truly respect, had tremendous appeal." On October 12, 2021, Deadline.com reported that Nick Searcy, Donald Cerrone, Tyler Fischer, Heath Freeman, and Samaire Armstrong had joined the cast. On October 15, 2021, Deadline.com announced that Gabriel-Kane Day-Lewis (son of actor Daniel Day-Lewis) was to make his feature acting debut.

Filming
Principal photography took place in Chico, Montana and Livingston, Montana from October 11 to November 5, 2021. The locations used for Terror on the Prairie were primarily based in Montana. The film was produced as a non union film in order to avoid COVID-19 vaccination mandates for cast and crew, wherein Carano stated, "Whether someone is vaccinated or not should not determine a person's ability to work in their different professions."

Marketing
On February 10, 2022, The Daily Wire promoted Terror on the Prairie by releasing the first image of the film, whilst debuting a 60-second trailer, with a reveal that accompanied the launch of their other film, Shut In (2022). On June 1, 2022, they released a full-length trailer.

Release
On June 14, 2022, Terror on the Prairie released exclusively to online subscribers of The Daily Wire. The film was released theatrically only in the United Arab Emirates and Russia where it earned a total of $13,115.

Home media
The film has been released on DVD in Canada, the United Kingdom, and Australia; and on Blu-ray in France.

Reception
On Rotten Tomatoes the film has 83% rating, based on reviews from 6 critics, with an average rating of 7.2 out of 10.

Film Threats Alan Ng gave the film a score of 8.5 out of 10, stating that "If you like your westerns gritty, violent, and viscerally brutal, you're in for a fun popcorn night at home." Ng also spoke positively of Carano and Searcy's performances. Wade Major of CineGods, awarding three out of four stars, described Terror on the Prairie as "below the surface, it's a grueling — and often gruesome — meditation on the lingering self-inflicted wounds left by the American Civil War in far-flung locales like frontier Montana and beyond." Major spoke highly of Searcy and Day Lewis's performances, though of Nelson's screenplay had stated that it "largely hews to formula, but it's a competent effort with well-drawn, if archetypal, characters and strong, credible dialogue [...]." Christian Toto wrote, in his review for Hollywood in Toto, "Terror on the Prairie lags a bit in the middle thanks to a protracted stand-off. Perhaps a bigger budget would let the production insert flashbacks or other scenes to enhance the story. Otherwise, the film charges forward, letting us marvel at how Hattie improvises on her children's behalf." Jorge Castillo of Starburst gave it 2 out of 5 and was positive about director Michael Polish but critical of Carano's central performance.

Notes

References

External links
 
 

2020s English-language films
2022 action drama films
2022 films
Films shot in Montana
2022 Western (genre) films
American action drama films
Films set in Montana
Films set in 1872
American Western (genre) films
Films directed by Michael Polish